India: Nature's Wonderland is a BBC nature documentary television series that aired in September 2015. Hosted by Liz Bonnin, Freida Pinto and Jon Gupta, the series documents the wildlife of India.

List of episodes

Episode 1

Liz, Jon and Freida reveal India's hidden natural wonders; the Gir forest, home to the last Asiatic lions, the rare hoolock gibbons and the Anaimalai Hills of Kerala, which act as pathways for the local elephants.

Episode 2

This episode looks at the relationship the Indian people have with nature and the conservation efforts in place to save the wildlife.

References

External links

India: Nature's Wonderland at PBS
 

2015 British television series debuts
2015 British television series endings
BBC high definition shows
BBC television documentaries
Documentary films about nature
Television shows set in India
English-language television shows